Cape Fox may refer to:

 the Cape fox, a species of fox in South Africa
 Cape Fox (Alaska), a cape in the Alaska Panhandle near Prince Rupert, British Columbia
 Cape Fox (Ketchikan), a cape in the Ketchikan Gateway area of the Alaska Panhandle
 Cape Fox Village, a historical village of the Tlingit near Cape Fox, Ketchikan Gateway
 Cape Fox people, aka the Cape Fox tribe, a name for the Sanyaa Kwáan or Southward Tribe of the Tlingit
 Fox Cape, a cape in the Eastern Aleutians
 Cape Lises, in the Western Aleutians, from the Russian lisa for "fox", is also known as Fox Cape

Vessels named Cape Fox:
 CCGS Cape Fox, a Canadian Coast Guard search and rescue lifeboat
 USCGC Cape Fox was a United States Coast Guard Cape-class cutter